Pseudaclytia pseudodelphire is a moth in the subfamily Arctiinae. It was described by Rothschild in 1912. It is found in Venezuela.

The length of the forewings is 18–20 mm. The forewings are purple-brown, the basal half of the subcostal nervure white and with a white oblique band at the apex of the cell. The hindwings are sooty black, strongly glossed with blue.

References

Natural History Museum Lepidoptera generic names catalog

Moths described in 1912
Arctiinae